Agony of a Dying MMO is a 2021 video game released by independent developer Salem Hughes. Described as a "narrative horror game", the game takes place in the final hours of a massively multiplayer online game before the servers shut down. The game was first released on the 2021 Haunted PS1 Demo Disc, a horror game compilation curated and published by Irish video game developer Breogán Hackett on itch.io.

Plot 

Agony of a Dying MMO takes place from the perspective of a player playing the a fictitious massively multiplayer online game, Garden of Windows, a game once with a large and popular fanbase that is reaching the end of its life and is to have its servers discontinued at midnight. Numerous players are still active in the game, belonging to the Resistance, Nazis, Furries, and Cenobites factions, and they have varying goals. Players remain until the last moments of the game to recount their experiences, fight one another, and come to terms with the permanent end of Garden of Windows. However, a small amount of players also remain to search for a non-player character named Adam who is rumored to grant players ultimate power.

Development 

Hughes stated that the themes of Agony of a Dying MMO were inspired by the experience of exploring abandoned servers for online games such as Counter-Strike, stating "There was something about the combination of primitive 3D and not experiencing that space with another person and being completely alone that felt very wrong...it’s stuck with me ever since.” Other sources of inspiration cited by Hughes included the Oleander Garden's 2019 game Pagan: Autogeny, a game similarly set within a dead MMO, to which Hughes stated the game "got (me) thinking about how digital spaces shut down...it kind of opened up a whole new world of storytelling."

Reception 

Agony of a Dying MMO received praise for its narrative and verisimilitude in its representation of early online games, with several websites stating the game was a highlight of the Haunted PS1 Demo Disc. Writing for The Gamer, Joshua Henry praised the "strong narrative and focus on characters", stating "the voice acting and the dialogue are well done and playing through the game feels like meeting the same types of people you would in an actual MMO. The scenario outlined here could easily be pulled from someone's actual experience in an MMO that is about to be shutdown." Calum Fraser of Alpha Beta Gamer similarly stated "the retro styled visuals are very effective and it’s got a great sense of atmosphere, but it’s the people that you meet that really make the game. They’re all very well written and voice acted, feeling very much like the best and worst sorts of people you’d meet on a real MMO." Writing for Vulture, Luke Winkie stated "Anyone who has wandered through the abandoned capital cities of World of Warcraft or EverQuest knows what it’s like to witness the gradual decay of a place where thousands of players used to congregate, now forsaken on unmanned servers and whirring away in perpetuity like a numbers station."

References

External links 

2021 video games
2020s horror video games
Freeware games
Indie video games
Single-player video games
Windows games
Windows-only games